Ovios is a genus of moths of the family Noctuidae. The genus was erected by Francis Walker in 1855.

Species
 Ovios capensis Herrich-Schäffer, [1854]
 Ovios nealces Fawcet, 1915

References

Agaristinae